A retailers' cooperative is a type of cooperative which employs economies of scale on behalf of its retailer members. Retailers' cooperatives use their purchasing power to acquire discounts from manufacturers and often share marketing expenses. A retailers' cooperative is essentially a group of independently owned businesses that pool their resources to purchase in bulk, usually by establishing a central buying organization, and engage in joint promotion efforts. It is common for locally owned grocery stores, hardware stores, and pharmacies to participate in retailers' cooperatives.

A consumers' cooperative, sometimes referred to as a retail cooperative, should be distinguished from a retailers' cooperative.

Governance and operation
Retailers' cooperatives are governed by democratic member control, which generally means one vote per member. Some firms, such as E. Leclerc, are able to make decisions in this fashion, with each member business only receiving one vote.  For many retailer co-ops, however, it is difficult to achieve a democratic standard. Since the members are businesses rather than individuals, offering one vote per member will leave the larger member businesses underrepresented. If the number of votes is based on the size of the business, there is a risk of all smaller businesses within the cooperative being outvoted by a larger business. A democratic solution that many retailers' cooperatives employ is an increase in votes based on business size, up to a certain point, say 5 or 10 votes. This way, there is a varying degree of representation for member businesses, but no one member can gain too much control.

Financing and economic goals
In order to lower costs, retailers' cooperatives establish central buying locations, providing them with the opportunity to purchase in bulk. Retailers' cooperatives also engage in group advertising and promotion, uniform stock merchandising, and private branding.  This leads to consumer recognition of brands such as ACE Hardware, giving the stores the benefits of being a franchise, with the autonomy and freedom of an independent store.

The aim of the cooperative is to improve buying conditions for its members, which are retail businesses in this case. The incentive to remain in the cooperative is largely due to the profits that members gain. Generally, any surpluses are shared by the members in accordance with their original input.

Examples

Examples of retailer's cooperatives include the following:
Australia and New Zealand
Mitre 10 
Foodstuffs
Canada
Carpet One
Federated Co-operatives
Home Hardware
United States
Carpet One
Ace Hardware
Chez Hotels
Do It Best
True Value (until 2018, now privately owned)
Best Western
ShopRite
National Automotive Parts Association (NAPA)
France
E.Leclerc
Les Mousquetaires
Système U
Germany
Edeka
Italy
Conad
United Kingdom
Nisa
Edinburgh Bicycle Cooperative

References

See also

 Cooperative

 

de:Einkaufsgenossenschaft